Bianca Ryan is the debut album from America's Got Talent season 1 winner of the same name. Bianca Ryan was part of a five-record deal signed by Ryan and SYCOmusic in 2006, and features cover versions of "The Rose" and "I Believe I Can Fly" and original songs like "I Wish That" and "Pray for a Better Day".

The album debuted at no. 57 on the Billboard top 200 albums chart, selling over 200,000 copies worldwide. It produced two singles, "You Light Up My Life" and "Why Couldn't It Be Christmas Every Day?"

Album and singles
One week after she won America's Got Talent, Bianca Ryan announced on her website that she had flown to New York to meet with representatives from a record label and some of the recording industry's top songwriters. The following month, Ryan was in Los Angeles for the recording sessions. Bianca Ryan was released on November 14, 2006; it debuted and peaked at no. 57 on the Billboard top 200 albums chart.

A video for "You Light Up My Life" also was released in November. "Why Couldn't It Be Christmas Every Day?" was not an official single release by Columbia Records, but radio stations in several countries played the song in 2006 as part of their Christmas-themed programming. The song reached no. 15 on the official Dutch Top 40. A longer remix was included on the promotional EP Christmas Everyday!

Critical reception

Matt Collar of AllMusic said that the arrangements were "grandiose" for someone of Ryan's age, but they were "more than matched by her truly impressive vocal talent." Los Angeles Daily News reviewer Sandra Barrera wrote that Ryan handled the songs "like the old pro that her big, powerful voice makes you think she is".

Track listing

Charts

Release history

References

2006 debut albums
Bianca Ryan albums
Columbia Records albums
Syco Music albums